The European Council for Business Education (ECBE) is a non profit organisation headquarters in Belgium. It delivers unrecognised private accreditation to private and public business schools and universities.

Accreditation validity
 ECBE delivers non-governmental private accreditations. ECBE's accreditation standards and procedures are based on the European Standards and Guidelines (ESG) as part of the Bologna Process, but the organization is not registered with EQAR and its accreditation is therefore not considered equivalent to a state accreditation.
 ECBE's educational accreditation process is based upon self and peer evaluation.
 ECBE is overseen by a Board of Directors elected from the members. A separate Board of Commissioners oversees the application of procedures and accreditation awarding.
 Formal affiliations of ECBE: ECBE is cited as a registered affiliate of the European Association for Quality Assurance in Higher Education (ENQA). ECBE is not a member of the American Council for Higher Education Accreditation (CHEA).

References

External links
Official website

Business education
Higher education accreditation
Higher education organisations based in Europe
Organizations established in 1991
1991 establishments in Europe